Barwickia is a genus of prehistoric lungfish which lived during the Devonian period. Fossils have been found in Victoria, Australia.

References 

Prehistoric lungfish genera
Devonian bony fish
Prehistoric fish of Australia